Caribou Lake is a lake in the Ottawa River drainage basin in Strathy Township of Temagami, Nipissing District in Northeastern Ontario, Canada. The municipality centre of Temagami is located on the north-northwestern shore of the lake.

The primary outflow is an unnamed creek to Snake Island Lake, which flows via Cassels Lake, Rabbit Lake, the Matabitchuan River and Lake Timiskaming into the Ottawa River.

See also
Lakes of Temagami
Jumping Cariboo Lake

References

Strathy Township
Lakes of Temagami